Gustave Louis Jaulmes (14 April 1873 – 7 January 1959) was an eclectic French artist who followed the neoclassical trend in the Art Deco movement.
He created monumental frescoes, paintings, posters, illustrations, cartoons for tapestries and carpets and decorations for objects such as enamels, sets of plates and furniture.

Life

Early years 
Gustave Louis Jaulmes was born in Lausanne, Switzerland on 14 April 1873.
He attended the École nationale supérieure des Beaux-Arts in Paris.
Jaulmes initially trained as an architect, and worked with Victor Laloux at the Gare d'Orsay before taking up painting.
In 1902 he abandoned architecture, and after a few months in the studio of Jean-Paul Laurens at the Académie Julian he decided to become a decorative painter.

Pre-war period 

Jaulmes saw his work as a complement and extension of buildings, and made professional and personal links with architects such as Louis Süe.
He became known for his monumental frescos and paintings, and for his posters and sets of decorative objects.
He worked with Adrien Karbowsky on frescos for the Villa Kerylos and the Palais de Chaillot in 1902–08.
They painted the walls of the villa with scenes from Greek mythology chosen by the scholar Théodore Reinach, often copied from Attic pottery.
In 1909 Jaulmes and Karbowsky decorated the fashionable Royal-Hôtel in Évian-les-Bains.
In 1912 Jaulmes joined other artists to create L'Atalier Français, a cooperative business that borrowed organizational idea from the Wiener Werkstätte.
Other members included Louis Süe, Roger de La Fresnaye, André Groult, André Mare and the brothers André and Paul Vera.
André Vera wrote a manifesto that defined the goal of the group as combining traditional and modern ideas to bring clarity, order and aesthetic unity to interior design.

Post-war 
In 1919 Jaulmes helped decorate the Victory Celebrations that followed World War I (1914–18).
Louis Süe, André Mare, Jaulmes and Antoine Sartorio were commissioned to create the temporary cenotaph of the Arc de Triomphe.
That year Süe and the painter André Mare launched the Compagnie des Arts Français, the successor to the L'Atalier Français.
Jaulmes was among the artists who contributed textile designs to the company.
Others were Marianne Clouzot, Jacques Drésa (André Saglio), Marguérite Dubuisson, Charles Martin, Maurice Taquoy and Paul Vera.
Through the company he received many public and private commissions for hotels, casinos, town halls and exhibition rooms. He contributed decorations to the 1921 International Exposition in Ghent, and to the International Expositions in Paris in 1925, 1931 and 1937.
He decorated the Musée Rodin and the SS Île de France.

For the Town Hall of the fifth arrondissement in Paris in the La salle des Fêtes Jaulmes made the stage curtain with an allegory of "Letters, Sciences and Law", that represents young women and children adorning a garden with garlands. He also decorated the ceiling of the room with geometric motifs of festivals and garlands.
He painted a fresco of Le théâtre antique for the monumental Art Deco Théâtre national de Chaillot, built in 1937.
In 1939 he decorated the ceiling of the Salle des Mariages in the Neuilly-sur-Seine town hall.
In 1940 he created large murals for the Salle des Pas Perdus in the Centre William Rappard in Geneva, then the headquarters of the International Labour Organization, depicting Dans la joie universelle, Le travail dans l'abondance and Le bienfait des loisirs.

Gustave Louis Jaulmes died in Paris on 7 January 1959.

Works

Decorator 

 1903–07: Villa Kerylos, Beaulieu-sur-Mer (1903–1907)
 1903–07: Palais de Chaillot: Frescos in the grand foyer with Louis Süe
 1909: Frescos and enamels at the Royal Palace in Evian
 1911: Synagogue of Boulogne-Billancourt
 1911: Arras town hall: Decoration of the marriage hall
 1918: Musée Rodin: Decoration of the salle du Baiser
 1919: Decoration of the Fêtes de la Victoire, Avenue de la Grande Armée, with André Mare and Louis Süe
 1923: Frescoes of the Temple protestant de Reims, covered by whitewash in 1972
 1925: Décoration of the SS Île de France with Louis Süe
 1925: International Exposition of Modern Industrial and Decorative Arts in Paris
 1931: Paris Colonial Exposition
 1934: Théâtre de Carcassonne
 1935: Cachan town hall
 1937: Exposition Internationale des Arts et Techniques dans la Vie Moderne
 1937: Théâtre du Trocadéro; (now Théâtre national de Chaillot), foyer and vestibule with Jean Niermans, Édouard Niermans and Louis Süe
 1939: Dining room of the marriage hall of the Neuilly town hall
 1940: Paintings in the salle des Pas-Perdus of the Centre William Rappard
 Church of Saint-Nicaise in Reims
 Frescoes and the stage curtain of the hall of the Town Hall of the fifth arrondissement in Paris
 The musée A.-G. Poulain in Vernon, Eure displays three decorative wall panels from the dining room of Paul Noccard in Neuilly.
 Uccle (Brussels): Frescos of the Château de La Fougeraie, built by Louis Süe for the industrialist Paul Wittouck
 Hôtel Bristol, Rue du Faubourg Saint-Honoré in Paris: Art Nouveau panel of the Four Seasons Jaulmes also painted the coffered ceiling of Le Bristol's Restaurant d'Hiver in classical motifs.
 Villa Nocard, Neuilly

Paintings 
Arras: Canvases for the dining room of honor of the Exposition des Arts décoratifs of 1925
1925: The French national coat of arms on a tapestry, titled "Les armes de France". Commissioned by the city of Strasbourg, this piece was to be installed at the Commissariat General of the Republic in the city.
Musée départemental de l'Oise in Beauvai: Several canvases including one of "Madame Jaulmes et sa fille"
Musée des années trente at Boulogne-Billancourt: Canvas of Simone, daughter of the artist, on the terrace of the Villa Kerylos

Illustrations 
Various books by Frédéric Mistral
1921 Poster for the Salon d'Automne1927 Christmas edition of L'Illustration1945 Le Cantique des Cantiques'', Paris, Les Éditions Universelles

Notes

Sources 

1873 births
1959 deaths
French artists
Académie Julian alumni
People from Lausanne
Swiss emigrants to France